Parmeliella is a genus of lichenized fungi in the family Pannariaceae.  It occurs mainly in the tropics and sub-tropics, with species found in Africa, Asia, Australasia and South America. A recent (2020) estimate places 41 species in the genus.

Species

Parmeliella aggregata  – New Zealand
Parmeliella alniphila 
Parmeliella angustiloba  – Ecuador
Parmeliella appalachensis 
Parmeliella asahinae 
Parmeliella clavulifera  – Mexico
Parmeliella coerulescens 
Parmeliella conopleioides  – Brazil; Venezuela; Costa Rica
Parmeliella corallina 
Parmeliella dactylifera  – South Africa
Parmeliella delicata  – Ecuador
Parmeliella diffracta 
Parmeliella expansa  – Ecuador
Parmeliella flavida 
Parmeliella foliicola 
Parmeliella furfuracea  – Australia
Parmeliella granulata 
Parmeliella gymnocheila 
Parmeliella himalayana  – India
Parmeliella isidiopannosa 
Parmeliella laceroides 
Parmeliella ligulata  – Australia
Parmeliella magellanica 
Parmeliella nigrata 
Parmeliella nigrocincta 
Parmeliella palmatula  – Australia
Parmeliella paramensis  – Ecuador
Parmeliella parvula 
Parmeliella philippina 
Parmeliella piundensis 
Parmeliella plumosella 
Parmeliella polydactyla 
Parmeliella saxicola 
Parmeliella serpentinicola 
Parmeliella subfuscata  – India
Parmeliella subtilis  – New Zealand
Parmeliella testacea 
Parmeliella thriptophylla 
Parmeliella thysanota 
Parmeliella triptophylloides  – Kenya
Parmeliella verruculosa

References

Peltigerales
Lichen genera
Peltigerales genera
Taxa named by Johannes Müller Argoviensis
Taxa described in 1862